Altybaysor is a salt lake in the Aksu City Administration, Pavlodar Region, Kazakhstan.

The area surrounding the lake is used for livestock grazing.

Geography
The Irtysh flows  to the east of the eastern shores of the lake. 

There are a number of smaller lakes in its vicinity, such as Zhamantuz  to the northwest, Batyrsha  to the west and Bozshasor  to the south.

See also
Sor (geomorphology)

References

External links

Садовая камышевка (Acrocephalus dumetorum). Птицы Казахстана.

Lakes of Kazakhstan
Pavlodar Region
Endorheic basins of Asia